Deep State is a British television espionage thriller series, written and created by Matthew Parkhill and Simon Maxwell, first broadcast in the United Kingdom on Fox on 5 April 2018. The first eight-part series, which began filming in May 2017, stars Mark Strong as Max Easton, a former Field Agent for MI6 who is recruited back into the field. The series co-starred Joe Dempsie, Karima McAdams, Lyne Renée, Anastasia Griffith and Alistair Petrie.

The series is produced by Endor Productions for the Fox Networks Group of Europe and Africa. As well as co-creating the series, Parkhill also serves as showrunner, executive producer and director of four of the eight episodes. The series premiered in the United States on 17 June 2018 on Epix.

A second season was commissioned on 5 April 2018. The second season premiered on 28 April 2019 in the United States, starring Walton Goggins as an ex-CIA operative drawn into a political crisis in Mali. As of 2022, there has been no confirmation of a third series.

Cast
 Mark Strong as Max Easton; former Field Agent, MI6. (Season 1)
 Walton Goggins as Nathan Miller; an ex-CIA operative. (Season 2)
 Joe Dempsie as Harry Clarke; Field Agent, MI6. Max Easton's son.
 Karima McAdams as Leyla Toumi; Field Agent, MI6.
 Anastasia Griffith as Amanda Jones; CIA.
 Alistair Petrie as George White; Head of Section, MI6.
 Lyne Renee as Anna Easton; Max's wife. (Season 1)
 Victoria Hamilton as Meaghan Sullivan; Senator working on the US Intelligence Committee. (Season 2)
 Rachel Shelley as Elliot Taylor; deputy Head of Section, MI6.

Supporting

Season 1 (2018)
 Adrien Jolivet as Noah; Anna Easton's brother.
 Cara Bossom as Chloë Easton; Max and Anna's elder daughter.
 Indica Watson as Lola Easton; Max and Anna's younger daughter.
 Alexandre Willaume as Laurence
 Mark Holden as John Lynn; CIA handler and Amanda Jones' boss.
 William Hope as Senator Hawes
 Bijan Daneshmand as Ali Ardavan
 Corey Johnson as Burrell
 Eric Kofi-Abrefa as Jackson
 Donald Sage Mackay as Martin Collins
 Kingsley Ben-Adir as Khalid Walker; Intelligence, MI6.
 Zubin Varla as Alexander Said; Senior Field Agent, MI6.
 Amelia Bullmore as Olivia Clarke; journalist. Harry's mother and Max's ex-wife.
 Khalid Laith as Anthony Kahani
 Mel Raido as Ryan Cooper; Field Agent, MI6.

Season 2 (2019)
 Lily Banda as Aïcha Konaté; interpreter.
 Zainab Jah as Aminata Sissoko; Malian Minister for Anti-Corruption.
 Hakeem Kae-Kazim as Joseph Damba; Malian Minister for Transport.
 David Jonsson as Isaac Turner; Field Agent, MI6.
 Alexander Siddig as Issouf Al Moctar
 Adam James as Adam McKay
 Sean Cameron Michael as Colonel John Russell.
 Kae Alexander as Jessica Tamura; assistant to Meaghan Sullivan.
 Mark Holden as John Lynn, former CIA handler.
 Pip Torrens as William Kingsley
 Owen Teale as Hal Weaver
 Mitchell Mullen as Senator Todd Wilson
 Ruth Gemmell as Gina Graham; partner of Meaghan Sullivan.
 Shelley Conn as Nicole Miller

Episodes

Season 1 (2018)

Season 2 (2019)

References

External links

Deep State on Epix

2018 British television series debuts
2010s British drama television series
British crime television series
British action television series
British thriller television series
English-language television shows
Espionage television series